The Witches Reel is a traditional Cèilidh dance from Scotland.

Scottish country dance